Oriole is an unincorporated community in Oil Township, Perry County, in the U.S. state of Indiana.

History
A post office was established at Oriole in 1890, and remained in operation until it was discontinued in 1967. The community was named after the New World oriole.

Geography

References

Unincorporated communities in Perry County, Indiana
Unincorporated communities in Indiana